The 1913 Gettysburg reunion was a Gettysburg Battlefield encampment of American Civil War veterans for the Battle of Gettysburg's 50th anniversary.  The June 29–July 4 gathering of 53,407 veterans (~8,750 Confederate) was the largest ever Civil War veteran reunion. All honorably discharged veterans in the Grand Army of the Republic and the United Confederate Veterans were invited, and veterans from 46 of the 48 states attended (cf. Nevada and Wyoming).

Despite official concerns "that there might be unpleasant differences, at least, between the blue and gray" (as after England's War of the Roses and the French Revolution), the peaceful reunion was repeatedly marked by events of Union–Confederate camaraderie.  President Woodrow Wilson's July 4 reunion address summarized the spirit: "We have found one another again as brothers and comrades in arms, enemies no longer, generous friends rather, our battles long past, the quarrel forgotten—except that we shall not forget the splendid valor."

Planning
After numerous smaller Gettysburg reunions, including the 1906 Philadelphia Brigade/Pickett's Division reunion, during which Brig. Gen. Lewis Armistead's captured sword was returned to the South, in April 1908 General Henry S. Huidekoper of Philadelphia suggested a 1913 50th anniversary reunion to Pennsylvania Governor Edwin Sydney Stuart.  On September 8, the Gettysburg National Park Commission met with Gettysburg borough officials about the event, Stuart conducted a sub-committee meeting on October 25, and Stuart addressed the General Assembly on the matter in January 1909.

On May 13, 1909, the Pennsylvania Assembly created the Fiftieth Anniversary of the Battle of Gettysburg Commission, and the commission's "first tentative programme" of October 13, 1910 included a "Peace Jubilee", with noon July 3 placement of the cornerstone for a  "Great Peace Memorial".  The August 26, 1912, US Congress bill appropriated $150K and directed the War Department to establish the camp. Because the memorial funding was not approved, the "Peace Jubilee" plans were removed from the schedule.

The Park Commission also completed painting of avenue fencing, gun carriages, iron tablets, pyramids, and shells from 1912 through June 30, 1913. On April 13, 1913, the Pennsylvania commission completed the Pennsylvania State Memorial and also mailed 40,000 veteran's invitations. On June 28, President Woodrow Wilson notified the Pennsylvania commission he would attend the reunion for a "very limited period". The 33 contributing states provided a total of $1,033,000 for the reunion ($450,000 from Pennsylvania).

The Pennsylvania commission headquarters at Gettysburg was at 231 Baltimore Street, with the Harrisburg office of the Secretary (later nicknamed the "Duke of Gettysburg") in Pennsylvania State Capitol Room 509.   Various commemorative tokens and programs were developed for attendees, including three types of Pennsylvania badges ("PRESS", "GUEST", "SCOUT"), a commemorative medal, and a souvenir program of poems by the attending "Veteran Scout", Jack Crawford.  The Pennsylvania Railroad Company added "a telephone line between Gettysburg and Hanover along the Western Maryland Railway, over which the Pennsy [would] operate a large number of trains during the battle anniversary".  On the Chambersburg-Gettysburg turnpike and the Gettysburg-Petersburg turnpike, tolls ended in time for the reunion. On June 27, the Pennsylvania Supreme Court upheld the 1911 Sproul Roads Act, by which the Commonwealth acquired private toll roads and made them free for the public.

By February 1, 1913, water wells were being drilled for the July encampment,  and by June 26 hotels in Hanover, Chambersburg, Hagerstown, and "the Blue Ridge section [were] filling rapidly".  For entertainment, a Gettysburg facility was started in 1912 to display the Boston version of the Gettysburg Cyclorama, and The Battle of Gettysburg black & white film of 1913 was first run at Walter's Theatre on June 26 (This film has since been lost).  Local planning for the reunion included expanding the Gettysburg hackman's tax to apply to automobiles  (upheld by the Pennsylvania Supreme Court in 1914), a 50 cent maximum for taxi fares in the borough, and an obscure request from a few Missouri veterans regarding the availability near Gettysburg of "a few good widows or old maids … good housekeepers and not too young" to go west after the reunion. (The "kind-hearted mayor", J. A. Holtzworth, agreed to forward photos to the veterans in the "Cupid … operations".)

Facilities

The War Department's Great Camp (Gettysburg Encampment, Anniversary Camp, Veterans Camp) provided tents and support facilities for the Civil War veterans and extended from both sides of Long Lane on the north  to within  of the Bliss House. The Great Camp included the Great Tent (Big Tent, measuring ) "with its thirteen thousand chairs"; the veterans' tents; quarters for 1,466 War Department soldiers (including camp commander Gen. Liggitt) & 2,179 mess personnel; 385 camp Boy Scouts from Washington; and other camp personnel for a total of 57,198 "persons quartered and subsisted in the Great Camp". The camp had a temporary U. S. Post Office; 90 Pennsylvania Health Department latrines throughout the camp with a seating capacity of 3,476; and near the Great Tent, an Emergency Station and 2 Comfort Houses of the health dept, which also supplied the Great Tent water fountains. The Pennsylvania commission also set up a temporary morgue in the camp. A special platform on the Round Top Branch was built for veterans to disembark from steam trains directly into the camp (in February, trolleys of the Gettysburg Electric Railway had been prohibited from using the branch).

After the state health department's Chief Engineer had estimated Gettysburg (pop. 4,500) would be inundated with 100,000 people,  the borough agreed to the Commissioner of Health's request for his department to take over medical and sanitation efforts in the area from June 25–July 25. The department set up a field hospital at the Kurtz property facing Brickyard Lane on the north foot of East Cemetery Hill, as well as 6 Comfort Stations in the borough (1 at each railroad station), with a total of ~100 hoppers. The department also tested borough wells and mitigated contamination sources upstream of the Water Works supply on Marsh Creek. The American Red Cross Society, along with 72 additional Boy Scouts, operated fourteen  Relief Stations for first aid and rest on the battlefield park roads. The Tuberculosis Dispensary in Gettysburg was also used as a Relief Station.

Attached to the Great Camp were a battery of the Third United States Field Artillery and several companies of Regular Infantry. Companies A-D (14 officers & 285 men) of the Fifteenth United States Cavalry arrived on June 26 to guard the battlefield and camped west of Seminary Ridge on the Hagerstown Rd.  A "model Camp" for a Pennsylvania cavalry squadron was on the "College Athletic Field" adjoining the commission's Headquarters.  A total of 527 people were quartered at both the Lutheran Theological Seminary at Gettysburg and the Pennsylvania College (renamed as "Gettysburg College" in 1921), including the Pennsylvania Gettysburg Commission, 4 troops of Pennsylvania State Police, and in tents, Governor Tener's staff.  Additional nearby encampments included the leased Newspaper Row ("Meadeboro") for 155 journalists, north of the Gettysburg National Cemetery, an encampment of 30 Boy Scouts near Cashtown west of Gettysburg for traveler services on the Chambersburg-Gettysburg Pike, and Philadelphia and Baltimore Salvation Army members encamped in Stonesifer's Grove at Biglerville, Pennsylvania.

Events
The Commission planned a four-day series of events, with each day dedicated to a different group:

Anticipating that some veterans might arrive early, especially those traveling distances, the Great Camp was opened for supper on June 29. Pennsylvania veterans who had attended the state reunion, which had adjourned on June 28, made up most of the more than 21,000 arrivals that day. Other veterans arriving early included two Confederate vets of Culp's Hill, who had arrived on June 26. Capt McCaskey of the Quartermasters Corps had estimated 6,000 men might arrive on June 29, and for a time struggled with severe shortages of food and supplies. Some veterans left without staying another night.

In more pre-Camp activities, on June 30 the 1912 base of the Virginia Monument was dedicated; the remainder of the monument was completed later.

July 1 Veterans' Day, included a speech by John Wanamaker of Philadelphia, the major department store developer and philanthropist.

July 2 Military Day, included an address by a military officer recommending a stronger military in this period of increasing tensions in Europe, where the Great War broke out in July 1914;  a reading of the Gettysburg Address; and a review of the Virginia division at Seminary Ridge by their governor. At night, an impromptu Union raid on the Confederate side of the Great Camp resulted in joint parades and camp fires following the "charge".

July 3 Civic/Governors' Day had 65 unit reunions, the dedication of the General William Wells statue; and a Webb/Pickett flag ceremony at the Bloody Angle on the hour of Pickett's Charge. Vice President Thomas R. Marshall and his wife, Speaker of the House Champ Clark, eight Senators, and 21 Congressmen were among officials who arrived that day for events. In the Great Tent from 4:30–6 pm was the New York Veterans' Celebration, which included a speech by Colonel Andrew Cowan, in which he again proposed a Gettysburg peace memorial.  The fireworks by the Pain Fireworks Display Company  at 9 pm included "gigantic set pieces covering the entire face and crest of Little Round Top".

July 4 National Day, the Pennsylvania State Memorial was dedicated; eight statues had been installed in April as part of it. President Woodrow Wilson arrived at 11 am in a special train car, traveled through the borough, and entered the Great Tent through two rows of Boy Scouts.  Wilson addressed the audience in the Big Tent about national unity, and departed the camp after the National Anthem was played. (Attendees similarly returned to their quarters).

At noon, a 5-minute tribute was held in silence for "Our Heroic Dead": people throughout the area stood at 'Attention',e.g., at the "College Hotel" and "Seminary Hotel".  The Tribute began with a bugle salute blown over the camp while the Gettysburg bells in the distance tolled noon. The remaining minutes of silence were punctuated by periodic artillery firing from the distance. From 5 am to 11 pm, 7,147 automobiles (at least one from each state) used the national park roads as visitors departed.

Some 12,000 veterans had already left on July 2 and about the same number on July 3. An unusual event took place on the evening of July 2 at the Hotel Gettysburg. W. B. Henry, a Southerner living in Philadelphia, erupted in violence after saying a "vile epithet" for President Lincoln and causing an argument at his table. A Union man threw his drink at Henry, who stabbed and slashed men at the table and on his way out to the street before being apprehended. Henry claimed that his father had been a Confederate general, but this was not verified. The Virginia governor spoke to officials on behalf of Henry. His father, who had been a major in the C.S.A., posted bail for his son. The victims, all but one of whom was taken to a hospital, were all expected to recover, and most were released from the hospital the next day.

Dismantling of the Great Camp began immediately after the July 4 Tribute. The hospital closed on July 5, and the last veteran left on July 8. The annual military instructional camp (250 college students) used a few tents of the veterans camp while encamped at the "Meadeboro" camp (Newspaper Row) from July 7–August 15. The Quartermaster headquarters on Baltimore St closed on August 13, and by August 15 the entire Grand Camp had been removed except "four great water storage reservoirs". A movie, United at Gettysburg, called a "romance", documented the reunion and was shown in some local theaters.

To commemorate the 1913 Gettysburg reunion, a colonial portico was opened in May 1914 at the Seminary's Old Dorm. (Only the concrete base remains.) In 1938 the Eternal Light Peace Memorial was erected on Oak Ridge, north of Gettysburg.

See also
 Commemoration of the American Civil War#Reenactments
 Historical reenactment

References

Further reading
 Flagel, Thomas R. (2019). War, Memory, and the 1913 Gettysburg Reunion. Kent, OH: Kent State University Press.
 

Gettysburg reunion
Reunions
Pennsylvania historical anniversaries
Gettsysburg
Gettysburg reunion
Gettysburg Battlefield
June 1913 events
July 1913 events
American Civil War anniversaries